Megachile murina is a species of bee in the family Megachilidae. It was described by Friese in 1913.

References

Murina
Insects described in 1913